1911 Cobar state by-election may refer to:

 September 1911 Cobar state by-election, held on 23 September 1911
 December 1911 Cobar state by-election, held on 2 December 1911

See also
 List of New South Wales state by-elections